Dona may refer to:

 Feminine form for don (honorific) (Spanish: doña, Portuguese: dona; Italian: donna), a Spanish, Portuguese, southern Italian, and Filipino title, given as a mark of respect
 Feminine form for dom (title), titled nobility in Portugal and Brazil, and in English for certain Benedictine and Carthusian monks

People

 Dona Ivone Lara (1921–2018), Brazilian singer
 Dona Neuma (1922–2000), Brazilian samba dancer
 Francesco Donà (1468–1553), Doge 
 Leonardo Donà (1536–1612), Doge  
 Nicolò Donà (died 1618), Doge  
 :it:Pietro Donà (1390–1447), bishop of Padua, chair of Council of Basel

Other
 "Dona" (song), 2016 Eurovision song performed by Macedonian singer-songwriter Kaliopi
 "Dona, Dona", a song written by Sholom Secunda and Aaron Zeitlin and popularized by Joan Baez
 Doña Blanca, a white grape
 Dona, a cornmeal mush
 Dona, another name for Pamana Island in Indonesia

See also 

 La Doña (disambiguation)
 Doña Ana (disambiguation)
 Donka (disambiguation)
 Donna (disambiguation)